Lucas Camelo (born 7 February 1999) is a French professional footballer who plays as a defender for Championnat National 2 club GOAL FC.

Career
On 18 May 2020, Camelo signed his first professional contract with Chambly. He made his debut with the club in a 3–0 Ligue 2 loss to Clermont on 16 October 2020.

Personal life
Camelo is the cousin of the French footballer Maxime Gonalons.

Notes

References

External links
 
 FDB Profile

1999 births
Living people
Footballers from Lyon
French footballers
Association football defenders
FC Villefranche Beaujolais players
GOAL FC players
FC Chambly Oise players
Ligue 2 players
Championnat National players
Championnat National 2 players